is a Japanese actor and model. He is under the Japanese talent Agency Japan Music Entertainment. He is known for playing as Alata (Gosei Red) in Tensou Sentai Goseiger and its movies. He reprised this role in a voice-only appearance in Kamen Rider × Super Sentai: Super Hero Taisen.

Filmography

TV series
 Tensou Sentai Goseiger (TV Asahi / 2010–2011) – Arata/Gosei Red
 Ouran High School Host Club (TBS / 2011) – Mitsukuni Haninozuka
 Runaway: For Your Love (TBS / 2011) – Toshio Inui
 Fallen Angel (BS Asahi / 2012) – Kuma-chan
 Shirato Osamu no Jikenbo (TBS / 2012) – Shirato Osamu
 Princess of the Frog (Fuji TV / 2012) – Shinobu Takagaki
 Kuro no Onna Kyoshi (TBS / 2012) – Ryohei Mochizuki
 Taira no Kiyomori (NHK / 2012) – Emperor Takakura
 Resident - 5-nin no Kenshui (TBS / 2012) – Minato Miyama
 Take Five (TBS / 2013) – Yano Shoutarou
 Summer Nude (Fuji / 2013) – Yoneda Haruo
 Eve in Love (2013)
 Shitsuren Chocolatier (Fuji / 2014) – Daisuke Nakamura
 Water Polo Yankees (Fuji / 2014) – Tomoki Kimura
 The File Of Young Kindaichi Neo (NTV / 2014) – Kentaro Kato (Ep 3–4)
 Kyou wa Kaisha Yasumimasu (NTV / 2014)
 Kazoku no Katachi (TBS / 2016) – Haruto Irie
 Ie Uru Onna (2016) – Satoshi Adachi
 Warotenka (2017) – Shin'ichi Fujioka
 Ani ni Ai Saresugite Komattemasu (NTV / 2017) – Takane Serikawa
 Final Fantasy XIV: Dad of Light (Netflix / 2017) – Akio Inaba 
 The Kitazawas: We Mind Our Own Business (2018)- Matsuya Kusunoki
 Pocket Monsters: Sun & Moon (2018) – Ilima (voice)
 Ieyasu, Edo wo Tateru (2019)
 The Sunflower on the Shogi Board (2019) – Keisuke Kamijō
 Ossan's Love: In the Sky (2019) – Ryu Naruse
 Likes! Mr. Genji (2020) – Hikaru Genji
 Double (2022) – Takara

Films
 Samurai Sentai Shinkenger vs. Go-onger: GinmakuBang!! (2010) – Gosei Red (voice only)
 Tensou Sentai Goseiger: Epic on the Movie (2010) – Alata/Gosei Red
 Tensou Sentai Goseiger vs. Shinkenger: Epic on Ginmaku (2011) – Alata/Gosei Red
 Gokaiger Goseiger Super Sentai 199 Hero Great Battle (2011) – Alata/Gosei Red
 Tensou Sentai Goseiger Returns (2011) – Alata/Gosei Red
 Kamen Rider × Super Sentai: Super Hero Taisen (2012) – Gosei Red (voice only)
 Gekijoban Oran Koko Hosutobu (2012) – Mitsukuni Haninozuka
 Ao Haru Ride (2014) – Kikuchi Toma
 Bakumatsu Kokosei (2014) – Shintaro Numata
 Mr. Maxman (2015) – Masayoshi Taniguchi
 Tsuugaku Series Tsuugaku Densha (2015) – Harukawa Tanaka
 Tsuugaku Series Tsuugaku Tochu (2015) – Harukawa Tanaka
 Kurosaki-kun no Iinari ni Nante Naranai (2016) – Takumi Shirakawa
 The Magnificent Nine (2016) – Chūnai Chisaka
 Unrequited Love (2016) – Kaname
 My Brother Loves Me Too Much (2017) – Takane Serikawa
 Ankoku Joshi (2017)
 Teiichi: Battle of Supreme High (2017) – Okuto Morizono
 ReLIFE (2017) – Ryō Yoake
 Ajin: Demi-Human (2017) – Masumi Okuyama
 Yo-kai Watch Shadowside: Oni-ō no Fukkatsu (2017) – Touma Tsukinami (voice)
 Louder!: Can't Hear What You're Singin', Wimp (2018) – Sakaguchi
 Run! T High School Basketball Club (2018)
 Stolen Identity (2018) – Manabu Kagaya
 The 47 Ronin in Debt (2019) – Isoda Takedayū
 No Longer Human (2019) – Kaoru Ōta
 Stolen Identity 2 (2020) – Manabu Kagaya
 One Summer Story (2021) – Akihiro Moji
 To the Supreme! (2022) – Tomu Hoshikawa

Japanese dub
 Hop (2011) – Fred O'Hare
 Peter Rabbit (2018) – Peter Rabbit
 Peter Rabbit 2: The Runaway (2021) – Peter Rabbit

Awards and nominations

References

External links
 Japan Music Entertainment profile 
 Yudai Chiba ─ Ameblo Blog

Japanese male actors
Living people
1989 births